Darou refers to:

Senegal
Darou Hidjiratou
Darou Kourarou
Darou Minam (arrondissement)
Darou Mousti Arrondissement

Iran
Darou Pakhsh
Behestan Darou
Cobel Darou

See also
Dahu, known as "daru" in Picardy